Al-Mu'tadid II, (died 23 July 1441) was the eleventh Abbasid caliph of Cairo for the Mamluk Sultanate between 1414 and 1441.

References

Bibliography

1441 deaths
Cairo-era Abbasid caliphs
15th-century Abbasid caliphs
Year of birth unknown
Sons of Abbasid caliphs